Legislative elections were held in New Caledonia on 10 September 1972. They had originally been scheduled for July, but were postponed by the French government. Anti-autonomist parties won 18 of the 35 seats, with the previously dominant Caledonian Union reduced from the 22 seats it won in 1967 to only 12.

Background
Prior to the elections, the Caledonian Union (UC) held 12 seats in the 35-member Territorial Assembly, the Caledonian Liberal Movement (a breakaway from the UC) seven, the Democratic Union five, the Multi-Racial Union four, the Democratic and Social Agreement four, the Association of French Caledonians and Loyalists one, the Civic Union one and the Caledonian Popular Movement one.

Campaign
Nine parties contested the elections, with eleven lists running in the South constituency covering Nouméa.

Results
Pro-autonomy parties (the Caledonian Union and Multi-Racial Union) won seventeen seats, with anti-autonomist parties (the Democratic and Social Agreement, the Caledonian Liberal Movement, Democratic Union, Caledonian Popular Movement and AICLO) winning eighteen.

Elected members

Aftermath
Although anti-autonomist parties won a one-seat majority, by early 1973 autonomist parties held 20 of the 35 seats following the defection of three members, including Fredy Gosse.

Georges Chatenay resigned from the Assembly in March 1974 and was replaced by Joseph Tidjine. Gosse resigned in May 1974 and was replaced by Evenor de Greslan.

References

New Caledonia
Elections in New Caledonia
1972 in New Caledonia
New Caledonia
Election and referendum articles with incomplete results